Nishant may refer to:
Nishant (name), for people named Nishant
Nishant (film), 1975 Indian film
DRDO Nishant, Indian unmanned aerial vehicle